Brima or Brimah is an African name that may refer to the following people:
Given name
Brima Bangura (born 1981), Sierra Leonean football goalkeeper
Brima Dawson Kuyateh, Sierra Leonean journalist
Evans Brima Gbemeh, Sierra Leonean politician
Brima Kamara (disambiguation) – multiple people
Brimah Kebbie, English rugby league and rugby union player of Sierra Leonean descent
Brima Keita, Sierra Leonean football manager
Brima Koroma (born 1984), Sierra Leonean footballer
Brima Pepito (born 1985), Sierra Leonean footballer 
Brimah Razak (born 1987), Ghanaian footballer 
Brima Sesay (1981–2009), Sierra Leonean football goalkeeper

Surname
Amida Brimah (born 1994), Ghanaian basketball player
Alex Tamba Brima (1971–2016), Sierra Leonean military commander